Izzat Ki Roti is a 1993 Indian Hindi-language action drama film produced and directed by K. Pappu. It stars Sunny Deol, Rishi Kapoor, Juhi Chawla and Farha in pivotal roles.

Plot
Multi-millionaire Vijay manages a trucking service and is quite friendly with one of his truck drivers, Veerendra Pratap alias Veeru. Vijay finds out that Veeru is using his trucks to carry out illegal activities and thus turn him over to the police which results in Veeru getting 20 years jail term. Vijay and his wife Laxmi (Tanuja) then adopt Veeru's son, Krishna (Rishi Kapoor) and bring him to take up resident with their biological son, Jeet (Sunny Deol). Years later Veeru completes his sentence and thinks about closing in on Vijay only to learn that he is not alive any more and that his business is managed by Krishna and Jeet. Krishna loves Pinky and marries her. Jeet (Sunny Deol) and Jyoti (Juhi Chawla) are in love with each other. Veeru then schemes to create a rift between Jeet and Krishna over their inheritance without knowing that he has agreed to implicate his very own son, Krishna. Jeet and Krishna foil his attempt successfully and Jeet gets united with Jyoti.

Cast
Rishi Kapoor as Krishna
Sunny Deol as Jeet
Juhi Chawla as Jyoti 
Farah as Pinky
Anupam Kher as Girdharilal Chakradhari
Alok Nath as Kaka
Tanuja as Laxmi
Rammohan Sharma as Ram Prasad
Urmila Bhatt as Mrs. Ram Prasad
Kulbhushan Kharbanda as Vijay
Anjana Mumtaz as Parvati
Prem Chopra as Virender, Krishna's father.
Dan Dhanoa as Babu Harami
Arun Bali as Smuggler
Kamaldeep as Owner of Rahim Transport

Soundtrack

References

External links

1990s Hindi-language films
1993 films
Films directed by K. Pappu
Films scored by Bappi Lahiri
Films scored by Aadesh Shrivastava
Indian action drama films